is a 2016 Japanese film, serving as the film adaptation of the 2015-2016 Kamen Rider Series television series Kamen Rider Ghost, and featuring the debut of the protagonist of Kamen Rider Ex-Aid. It was released in Japan on August 6, 2016, in a double billing with Doubutsu Sentai Zyuohger the Movie: The Exciting Circus Panic!.

Plot
When Takeru and his friends celebrate Kanon's 15th birthday, the sky suddenly changes its color. Riding on the Iguana Ghostriker, Takeru, Makoto, and Alain investigate this phenomenon. What they discover is a giant Eyecon in the sky emitting a strange light, which sucked them in! Because of this, they were transported in a village where heroes from the ages are living together.

Cast
: 
: 
: 
: 
: 
: 
: 
: 
: 
: 
: 
: 
: 
: 
: 
: 
: 
: 
: 
: 
: 
: 
: 
: 
: 
: 
: 
: 
: 
: 
: 
: 
:

Theme song
"ABAYO"
Lyrics & Composition: Show Ayanocozey
Arrangement: Takeshi Kiuchi, Show Ayanocozey
Artist: Kishidan

Short Stories
 is a set of short movies to promote the movie that aired following episodes 39-42 of the series.

Reception
By its second weekend it had grossed .

References

External links

Kamen Rider Ghost
Japanese action films
2010s Kamen Rider films
2016 action films
2016 horror films
2010s Japanese films
Japanese supernatural horror films
Japanese dark fantasy films
Japanese action horror films
Superhero horror films